Uranophora castra is a moth in the subfamily Arctiinae. It was described by George Hampson in 1898. It is found in Paraná, Brazil.

References

Moths described in 1898
Euchromiina